The International Religious Freedom Report 2007, of U.S. Department of State, estimated that more than 8 million foreigners are living and working in Saudi Arabia, including Muslims and non-Muslims.

There are 400,000 Sri Lankans, as well as a few thousand Buddhist workers from East Asia, the majority of which are: Chinese, Vietnamese, and Taiwanese. There is also a possibility that a percentage of Nepalese immigrants also help make up the estimated 8 million foreign residents in Saudi Arabia.

This amount of foreign inhabitants makes about 1.5% of Saudi Arabia's population Buddhists, or around 400,000 nominal Buddhists, most likely giving Saudi Arabia the largest Buddhist community in the Middle East or Arab World.

See also 
 Index of Buddhism-related articles

References

The US State Department's International Religious Freedom Report 2007 - Saudi Arabia 

Saudi Arabia
Religion in Saudi Arabia
Sinhalese people